This is a list of Estonian television related events from 1959.

Events

Debuts
4 September - television series "TV ülikool" was started.

Television shows

Ending this year

Births

Deaths

See also
 1959 in Estonia

References

1950s in Estonian television